Joana Mallwitz (born 1986 in Hildesheim) is a German conductor and pianist.

Biography
Mallwitz began to study violin at age 3, and piano at age 5.  At age 14, she became a pupil of Christa-Maria Hartmann and Karl-Heinz Kämmerling.  She continued her music studies at the Hochschule für Musik und Theater Hannover, where her teachers included Martin Brauss and Eiji Ōue, in conducting, and she continued piano studied with Kämmerling and with Bernd Goetzke.  In 2004, she received a conducting scholarship from the Studienstiftung des deutschen Volkes.

In 2006, Mallwitz joined the conducting staff of the Theater und Orchester Heidelberg, at the invitation of then-GMD Cornelius Meister, as a repetiteur.  During her third month of work in Heidelberg, she made her debut professional conducting appearance there occurred on 6 hours' notice at the first night of the company's new production of Madama Butterfly.  From 2007 to 2011, she worked in Heidelberg as Zweite Kapellmeisterin (Second Kapellmeister) and assistant to the GMD.  In 2009, she was a recipient of the Praetorius Musik-Förderpreis.

In July 2013, Mallwitz was named Generalmusikdirektorin (General Music Director; GMD) of the Theater Erfurt, the first woman conductor named to the post in the institution's history.  She formally took up the post with the 2014–2015 season, at the time, the youngest GMD of a German opera house.  She concluded her Erfurt tenure at the close of the 2017–2018 season.

In October 2017, the Staatstheater Nürnberg announced the appointment of Mallwitz as its new GMD, effective with the 2018–2019 season, with an initial contract of 5 years.  She is the first female conductor to be named to the Nürnberg post.  In August 2020, Mallwitz made her debut at the Salzburg Festival with Così fan tutte, the third female conductor ever to conduct an opera production at the Salzburg Festival, and the first female conductor directly scheduled in advance by the Salzburg Festival for an opera production.  In July 2021, the Staatstheater Nürnberg announced that Mallwitz is to stand down as its GMD at the close of the 2022–2023 season.

Mallwitz first guest-conducted the Konzerthausorchester Berlin during the 2020–2021 season.  In August 2021, the orchestra announced the appointment of Mallwitz as its next chief conductor and artistic director, effective with the 2023–2024 season, with an initial contract of five seasons.  Mallwitz is the first female conductor to be named chief conductor of the Konzerthausorchester Berlin, and the first female conductor to be named chief conductor of any Berlin orchestra.

Mallwitz is married to the German tenor Simon Bode, who is an ensemble member of the Frankfurt Opera.  In 2019, Opernwelt magazine voted Mallwitz its Dirigentin des Jahres ('Conductor of the Year').  In November 2020, Mallwitz received the Sonderpreis (Special Prize) of the Bavarian Culture Prize.  Mallwitz and Bode had their first child in 2021.

References

External links
 Official website of Joana Mallwitz
 Michael Lewin International Artists' Management agency page on Joana Mallwitz

 

1986 births
Women conductors (music)
Living people
People from Hildesheim
21st-century German conductors (music)
21st-century German women musicians